Nicolaia schniebsae is a species of small freshwater snails with a gill and an operculum, an aquatic gastropod mollusc in the family Hydrobiidae.

Nicolaia schniebsae is the type species of the genus Nicolaia and it is the only species within the genus.

Distribution
Armenia

References

Hydrobiidae
Gastropods described in 2016